Usman Arshad (born 18 October 1983) is a Pakistani first-class cricketer who played for Faisalabad cricket team.

References

External links
 

1983 births
Living people
Pakistani cricketers
Faisalabad cricketers
Khan Research Laboratories cricketers
Cricketers from Sargodha